= Georgette Gebara =

Georgette Gebara (Arabic: جورجيت جبارة) is a Lebanese ballet dancer and choreographer, who is considered one of the pioneers of the classical ballet in Lebanon. Born in Jerusalem to a Lebanese father and a French-Spanish mother, her family moved to Egypt when she was a child, where she began learning ballet. Later, she moved to Lebanon and founded the first ballet school in the Middle East in 1964.

== Biography ==
Georgette was born in Beirut and began her artistic career at an early age, as she was one of the first to introduce the art of ballet professionally to Lebanon.

In 1964, Georgette founded the Lebanese Ballet School, and in 1972 she established a center for it in Tripoli. She contributed greatly to the development of ballet art in Lebanon by inviting foreign dance groups to participate in the Baalbek International Festivals.
